Ethel Collins Dunham (1883–1969), and her life partner, Martha May Eliot, devoted their lives to the care of children. Dunham focused on premature babies and newborns, becoming chief of child development at the Children's Bureau in 1935. She established national standards for the hospital care of newborn children and expanded the scope of health care for growing youngsters by monitoring their progress in regular home visits by Children's Bureau staff.

Biography 
Ethel Collins Dunham was born in Hartford, Connecticut, in 1883 to Samuel G. Dunham, a wealthy utility executive, and Alice Collins. She graduated from high school in 1901 and spent the next two years at boarding school. After several years of travel and leisure pursuits, she decided she wanted to study medicine and enrolled in a physics class at Hartford High School. She graduated from Bryn Mawr College in 1914 and began her medical training at the Johns Hopkins School of Medicine that same year with her friend and life partner, Martha May Eliot.

Dunham completed an internship in pediatrics at Johns Hopkins Hospital under Dr. John Howland, and then served as the first woman house officer at New Haven Hospital. She became one of Yale School of Medicine's first female professors. She was appointed instructor at Yale School of Medicine in 1920, promoted to assistant professor in 1924 and associate clinical professor in 1927. During this time she developed a special interest in improving the health of premature and newborn babies. She introduced numerous innovations at Yale, including buying a car so that interns could perform home visits for new mothers and their babies. She also reorganized the dispensary appointment system and negotiated with the chief of obstetrics to allow pediatricians to help care for new babies in the hospital nursery. In 1933 she presented her research on neonatal mortality and morbidity to the American Pediatric Society, which then appointed her head of its committee on neonatal studies.

In 1935 Dunham was appointed chief of child development at the Children's Bureau, a national agency established in 1912 to improve the health and welfare of American children. Martha May Eliot had been appointed assistant chief. Dunham's first initiative was to investigate the treatment of premature babies and establish national standards for the care of newborns. The results of her first study appeared in 1936, and in 1943 her guidelines were published as Standards and Recommendations for the Hospital Care of Newborn Infants, Full Term and Premature. She also launched new programs to take hospital health care into the homes of new mothers, via the efforts of a public health nurse and a Children's Bureau social worker, who followed the progress of babies after their discharge from New York Hospital. Once again, the results of her survey shaped policies and practices in many health districts. From 1949 to 1951 she studied the problem of premature birth with an international team of experts for the World Health Organization in Geneva.

Dunham retired in 1952. In 1957 the American Pediatric Society awarded her their highest honor, the John Howland Award. Dunham was the first woman pediatrician to receive the award; her life partner, Martha May Eliot was the second (honored in 1967).

References

External links 

 Dunham, Ethel C. (Ethel Collins), b. 1883. Papers, 1952-1965. [H MS c158]. Harvard Medical Library in the Francis A. Countway Library of Medicine, Center for the History of Medicine.

1883 births
1969 deaths
Bryn Mawr College alumni
Johns Hopkins School of Medicine alumni
Yale University faculty
American pediatricians
Women pediatricians
Lesbians
LGBT people from Connecticut
LGBT physicians
Physicians from Connecticut
People from Hartford, Connecticut
20th-century American physicians
20th-century American women physicians
American women academics